The Constabulary Medal was a decoration of the Royal Irish Constabulary (RIC).  The medal was established on 15 April 1842, by the Inspector General of the Royal Irish Constabulary and approved by the Lord Lieutenant of Ireland.  Though it was not formally created by the crown, but was a local award with viceregal approval, it was presented for eighty years and is found in the government's official order of wear.

Appearance

The obverse of the medal depicts a crowned harp within a wreath. The first version of the medal has the inscription "REWARD OF MERIT - IRISH CONSTABULARY" while the second version has the inscription "REWARD OF MERIT - ROYAL IRISH CONSTABULARY"  This change is in recognition of the addition of "Royal" to the name of the Irish Constabulary in 1867. The reverse bears a wreath half in olive leaves and the other half in shamrocks. The center is plain to allow for the engraving of the name of the recipient.

References

External links
 Image of the medal, second version
 The Royal Irish Constabulary Forum (medals)

Civil awards and decorations of the United Kingdom
Orders, decorations, and medals of Ireland
Law enforcement awards and honors
Awards established in 1842
Medal
Awards disestablished in 1922
1842 establishments in Ireland